Pristimantis labiosus is a species of frog in the family Strabomantidae.
It is found in Colombia and Ecuador.
Its natural habitats are tropical moist lowland forests, moist montane forests, and rivers.
It is threatened by habitat loss.

References

labiosus
Amphibians of Colombia
Amphibians of Ecuador
Amphibians described in 1994
Taxonomy articles created by Polbot